The 1924 Kentucky Derby was the 50th running of the Kentucky Derby. The race was run on May 17, 1924. The victory for Rosa Hoot's Black Gold marked the second time a woman owned the Derby winner and the second time a woman had been the winning breeder. However, it was the first time in history that a woman both owned and bred the winner.

Payout
The Kentucky Derby Payout Schedule

Field

Winning Breeder: Rosa M. Hoots (KY)

Margins – 1/2 length
Time – 2:05 1/5
Track – Fast

References

Kentucky Derby races
Kentucky Derby, 1924
Derby
Kentucky Derby